Cypa luzonica is a species of moth of the family Sphingidae. It is known from the Philippines.

References

Cypa
Moths described in 2009